Main Atal Hoon is an upcoming Hindi language biography Film directed by Ravi Jadhav and written by Utkarsh Naithani. It is starred by Pankaj Tripathi as Former Prime Minister, Atal Bihari Vajpayee. It's poster was released on 25 December 2022, on the 98th occasion on Birthday of Atal Bihari Vajpayee.

Cast
Pankaj Tripathi as Atal Bihari Vajpayee

References

External links
 
2023 films
2020s Hindi-language films
Upcoming Hindi-language films
Indian biographical drama films